Franz Wendelin Schmidt Silva (born 3 May 2000) is a Peruvian footballer who plays as a centre-back for Peruvian Segunda División side Alianza Universidad.

Career
Schmidt was promoted to Alianza Lima's reserve squad in February 2018. On 5 September 2019, Schmidt was loaned out to Peruvian Segunda División club Unión Huaral. He made his debut for the club on 12 October 2019 against Sport Loreto.

In January 2020, Schmidt was loaned out once again, this time alongside his teammate José Gallardo to Peruvian Primera División side Carlos A. Mannucci for the rest of the year.

In April 2021, Schmidt returned to Unión Huaral once again on a loan deal for the rest of the year. On 20 January 2022, Schmidt left Alianza Lima permanently, to join Peruvian Segunda División side Alianza Universidad.

References

External links
 

Living people
2000 births
Association football defenders
Peruvian footballers
Footballers from Lima
Peruvian Segunda División players
Club Deportivo Universidad de San Martín de Porres players
Club Alianza Lima footballers
Unión Huaral footballers
Carlos A. Mannucci players
Alianza Universidad footballers